Bni Makada is one of the four arrondissements or districts of the city of Ṭanja, Morocco. Administratively it is part of the prefecture of Ṭanja-Aẓila in the region of Ṭanja-Tiṭwan-Elḥusima. The 2014 Moroccan census recorded a population of 386,191 people living in 91,737 households.

Name
Bni Makada is named after a tribe of the Houara, who settled in the area in the late 17th century during the reign of Sultan Moulay Ismail ibn Sharif.

References

Tangier